The Ice Flood is a 1926 American silent northwoods drama film produced and distributed by Universal Pictures. It was directed by George Seitz and starred Kenneth Harlan and Viola Dana. A complete, though poor quality copy, exists and has been distributed by the Grapevine company in Arizona.

This film is also held by the Library of Congress.

Cast
Kenneth Harlan as Jack De Quincy
Viola Dana as Marie O'Neill
Frank Hagney as Dum-Dum Pete
Fred Kohler as 'Cougar' Kid
DeWitt Jennings as James O'Neill (Marie's father)
George Irving as Thomas De Quincey (Jack's father)
Norman Deming as 'Dumb' Danny 
Kitty Barlow as Cook
James Gordon as Thomas De Quincey

rest of cast
Norman Deming as Dumb Danny
Billy Kent Schaefer as Billy
Walter Brennan as Lumberjack (uncredited)

Production
Filming took place in Klamath Falls, Oregon.

References

External links

Lobby cards

1926 films
1926 drama films
American silent feature films
Films directed by George B. Seitz
American black-and-white films
Universal Pictures films
Silent American drama films
Films shot in Oregon
Surviving American silent films
Films about lumberjacks
Films based on works by Johnston McCulley
1920s American films